Camponotus auriculatus is a species of carpenter ant (genus Camponotus). It is found in Sri Lanka.

References

External links

 at antwiki.org

auriculatus
Hymenoptera of Asia
Insects described in 1897